Malchapur  is a panchayat village located in Bhalki taluka of Bidar District, Karnataka, India.  The village of Malchapur is 18 km by road west of the city of Bidar.

There are three villages in the Malchapur gram panchayat: Malchapur, Khanapur and Rudnoor.

Demographics 
 census, the village of Malchapur had 2,506 inhabitants, with 1,283 males (51.2%) and 1,223 females (48.8%), for a gender ratio of 953 females per thousand males.

Notes

External links
 

Villages in Bidar district